Baabdat is a town located in the Matn District of Mount Lebanon, 22 km from Beirut at an altitude ranging between 600 and 1100 meters above sea level.  The lush pine forests that surround the town make it a very popular summer resort for those escaping the busy coastal cities of Lebanon, especially the capital, Beirut.  The town's proximity to Brummana, one of Mount Lebanon's most active summer destinations, makes Baabdat a major tourist destination in the summer.

Demography

The inhabitants of Baabdat are members either of the Maronite Catholic Church, or the Melkite Greek Catholic Church.

Etymology
The name "Baabdat" is derivative of the Aramaic words, meaning "the home of adoration". The Aramaic name refers to an ancient temple that was built by the Phoenicians to worship the ancient Canaanite, Greek and later Roman gods.

History
When Lebanon was part of the Roman Empire, Baabdat was the center of wood choppers who transported trees to Beirut for use in ship construction.

Notable people from Baabdat

 Émile Lahoud- Lebanon's former president 
 Nassib Lahoud- politician 
 Carmen Labaki- film director 
 Nadine Labaki- director and actress 
 Salma Hayek- director and actress (her father is from Baabdat)
 Jamil Lahoud- A former army officer and minister

Notables who live in Baabdat

Although a native of Beirut, Maxime Chaya (the first from his country to climb Everest and ski all-the-way to both poles) moved to Baabdat where he now lives year-long with his children Edgard and Kelly.

Religious Structures

Like most mountain villages of Lebanon, Baabdat is home to numerous, historic churches, monasteries and convents.

Saint Mamas Church, built in the 16th century
Saint George Church, built in the mid-18th century
Our Lady of Deliverance Church, built in 1851
Saint Michael Greek Catholic Church
Saint Anthony of Padua Convent, completed in 1900

Climate

References

External links
Baabdat, Localiban
Toufic Labaki
Fallingrain
Saint Anthony of Padua Parish

Populated places in the Matn District
Coloniae (Roman)
Maronite Christian communities in Lebanon
Melkite Christian communities in Lebanon